The Moose River is an  river in Maine. Its source is in Beattie (Maine Township 2, Range 8, WBKP), on the Canada–United States border, which runs along the height of land between the watersheds of the Kennebec River in Maine and the Chaudière River in Quebec. From there, the river runs east through Attean Pond and Wood Pond, past the town of Moose River, then through Long Pond and Brassua Lake. The Moose River empties into Moosehead Lake, the source of the Kennebec River, in Rockwood Strip (T1, R1, WBKP). The International Railway of Maine was built along Moose River in 1889.

Attean Pond

Attean Pond covers the southeast corner of Attean Township. Moose River flows into the south end of Attean Pond from Bradstreet Township and overflows from the northeast corner of the Attean Pond. A second major tributary from Holeb Pond enters the western end of Attean Pond. Smaller tributary Williams Brook reaches the eastern shore of Attean pond, while Thompson Brook and McKenney Brook enter the east bank of Moose River between Attean Pond and Big Wood Pond. The railroad follows the southern shore of Holeb Pond and crosses the tributary to follow the northern shore of Attean Pond. Of the 2,745 acres, only 600 acres are deeper than 20 ft.

Wood Pond

Big Wood Pond or Wood Pond covers the northeast corner of Attean Township on the western edge of the town of Jackman, Maine. The main inflow is Moose River entering the south end of Big Wood Pond less than a mile downstream of Attean Pond. Gander Brook with a length of  flows into the north end of Big Wood Pond. The railroad crosses Moose River at the inlet and follows the eastern shore of the pond into Jackman Station. Moose River leaves Wood Pond through the town of Jackman.

Long Pond

Long Pond is less than a mile wide through the town of Jackman and Long Pond Township. The railroad follows the south shore. Tributaries Mountain Brook and Parlin Stream flow into the south side of the pond and Churchill Stream flows into the north side before Moose River overflows from the east end of the pond.

Brassua Lake

Brassua Lake occupies the southeast corner of Brassua Township, the southwest corner of Tomhegan Township, the center of Rockwood Strip, the northeast corner of Sandwich Academy Grant, and the northwest corner of Taunton and Rayham Academy Grant. Misery Stream flows  from Misery Pond into the south end of Brassua Lake, and Brassua Stream flows  into the north end of the lake. The railroad follows the southeastern shore of Brassua Lake before turning south to follow the western shore of Moosehead Lake.

See also
List of rivers of Maine

References

Maine Streamflow Data from the USGS
Maine Watershed Data From Environmental Protection Agency

Tributaries of the Kennebec River
Rivers of Franklin County, Maine
Rivers of Somerset County, Maine
Rivers of Maine
North Maine Woods
Northern Forest Canoe Trail